The Chinese grassbird (Graminicola striatus) is a  bird species in the family Pellorneidae.  It was formerly placed in the Old World warbler family Sylviidae and the babbler family Timaliidae.

Distribution and habitat
It occurs in tall emergent vegetation in or bordering freshwater swamps or along banks of rivers in the lowlands of southeastern China, Bangladesh, southeastern Myanmar, south-central Thailand, Cambodia, northeastern Vietnam, and Hainan Island. It is threatened by habitat loss.

References

 Collar, N. J., Robson, C. (2007) Family Timaliidae (Babblers)  pp. 70 – 291 In: del Hoyo, J., Elliott, A., Christie, D.A. (eds.) Handbook of the Birds of the World, Vol. 12: Picathartes to Tits and Chickadees. Lynx Edicions, Barcelona.

Chinese grassbird
Birds of China
Birds of Bangladesh
Birds of South China
Birds of Hong Kong
Birds of Hainan
Birds of Southeast Asia
Chinese grassbird
Chinese grassbird